David Correos (born 8 December 1992) is a comedian from New Zealand. He was the winner of the Billy T Award in 2016.

Early life
Correos's parents immigrated to Christchurch in the 1980s from the Philippines; he grew up in Woolston.

During his teens, Correos trained as a weightlifter and represented New Zealand at several international events, and won his weight division at the 2012 Junior Oceania Championships. He narrowly missed out for qualification for the 2014 Commonwealth Games, where a broken ankle ended his sporting career.

Wishing to perform in musical theatre, Correos attended a two-year drama course at Hagley College, after which he applied to a broadcasting school but was denied entry. He became interested in comedy and started performing arts at Hagley Theatre Company. His friend created a variety show called Monday Night Magic for artists that had no space to perform after the 2011 Christchurch earthquake. Correos started performing stand-up alongside musicians and street performers, and began learning how to write comedy.

He moved to Auckland in 2014 where he pursued a comedy career.

Career
Correos won the Billy T Award in 2016, and the Comic Originality award at the 2015 Comedy Guild Awards. He first performed at the Edinburgh Festival Fringe in 2017 with Matt Stellingwerf, their show entitled Chaos & Order. He returned to the Edinburgh Festival Fringe in August 2018 with a new show titled The Correos Effect, and at a later date also performed it at the Fringe Festivals in Dunedin, Auckland and Adelaide. In 2019, he performed his show Better Than I Was The Last Time at Fringe.

Correos' television credits include appearances as a panelist on 7 Days (on which he was also a writer), The Project and Taskmaster NZ.

Correos also appears in videos by sketch comedy group Viva La Dirt League.

References

Living people
New Zealand comedians
1992 births
New Zealand people of Filipino descent
New Zealand male weightlifters
People from Christchurch